Martín Ferrari (born 2 July 1958) is an Argentine sailor. He competed in the Tornado event at the 1984 Summer Olympics.

References

External links
 

1958 births
Living people
Argentine male sailors (sport)
Olympic sailors of Argentina
Sailors at the 1984 Summer Olympics – Tornado
Place of birth missing (living people)